The following is a list of Sites of Special Scientific Interest in the Shetland Area of Search. For other areas, see List of SSSIs by Area of Search.

 Aith Meadows
 Balta
 Breckon
 Burn of Aith
 Burn of Lunklet
 Burn of Valayre
 Catfirth
 Clothister Hill Quarry
 Crussa Field and The Heogs
 Culswick Marsh
 Dales Voe
 Dalsetter
 East Mires and Lumbister
 Easter Loch
 Easter Rova Head
 Eshaness Coast
 Fair Isle
 Fidlar Geo to Watsness
 Foula
 Foula Coast
 Fugla Ness - North Roe
 Funzie
 Graveland
 Gutcher
 Ham Ness
 Hascosay
 Hermaness
 Hill of Colvadale and Sobul
 Keen of Hamar
 Kergord Plantations
 Lamb Hoga
 Laxo Burn
 Loch of Clousta
 Loch of Girlsta
 Lochs of Kirkigarth and Bardister
 Lochs of Spiggie and Brow
 Lochs of Tingwall and Asta
 Lunda Wick
 Melby
 Mousa
 Muckle Roe Meadows
 Ness of Clousta - The Brigs
 Ness of Cullivoe
 North Fetlar
 North Roe Meadow
 North Sandwick
 Norwick
 Norwick Meadows
 Noss
 Otterswick
 Papa Stour
 Pool of Virkie
 Punds to Wick of Hagdale
 Quendale
 Qui Ness to Pund Stacks
 Quoys of Garth
 Ramna Stacks and Gruney
 Ronas Hill
 Sandness Coast
 Sandwater
 Saxa Vord
 Sel Ayre
 Skelda Ness
 Skeo Taing to Clugan
 South Whiteness
 St Ninians Tombolo
 Sumburgh Head
 The Ayres of Swinister
 The Cletts, Exnaboe
 The Vadills
 Tingon
 Tonga Greff
 Tressa Ness to Colbinstoft
 Trona Mires
 Uyea, North Roe Coast
 Valla Field
 Villains Of Hamnavoe
 Virva
 Voxter Voe and Valayre Quarry
 Ward of Culswick
 Yell Sound Coast

 
Shetland
SSI